K(lysine) acetyltransferase 6B (KAT6B) is an enzyme that in humans is encoded by the KAT6B gene.

Interactions
KAT6B has been shown to interact with RUNX2.

Clinical significance
It has been demonstrated that de novo mutations in the gene KAT6B causes Young–Simpson syndrome and genitopatellar syndrome.

References

Further reading

External links 
 
 

Transcription factors